Matthew Marchant (born 1981) is an English male lawn and indoor bowler.

He is an England international  and was the National Men's Champion of Champions Singles Champion in 2014 during the Men's National Championships.

He bowls outdoors for Southsea Waverley.

References

1981 births
Living people
English male bowls players